Sierra High School may refer to:

Sierra High School (Mammoth Lakes, California), Mammoth Lakes, California
Sierra High School (Manteca, California), Manteca, California
Sierra High School (San Bernardino, California), 570 East Ninth Street San Bernardino, California 92410  
Sierra High School (Tollhouse, California), Tollhouse, California
Sierra High School (Whittier, California), Whittier, California
Sierra High School (Colorado), Colorado Springs, Colorado  
La Sierra High School, Riverside, California
Sierra Vista High School (Spring Valley, Nevada), Spring Valley, Nevada